The Alliance for Telecommunications Industry Solutions (ATIS) is a standards organization that develops technical and operational standards and solutions for the ICT industry, headquartered in Washington, D.C. The organization is accredited by the American National Standards Institute (ANSI). It is the North American Organizational Partner for the 3rd Generation Partnership Project (3GPP), a founding Partner of the oneM2M global initiative, a member of and major U.S. contributor to the International Telecommunication Union (ITU), as well as a member of the Inter-American Telecommunication Commission (CITEL).

ATIS has 150 member companies, including various telecommunications service providers, equipment manufacturers, and vendors. The organization encompasses numerous industry committees and fora, which discuss, evaluate, and author guidelines concerning such topics as 5G, cybersecurity, network reliability, technological interoperability, emergency services, billing, M2M, the all IP transition, and network function virtualization.

References

Standards organizations in the United States
Telecommunications organizations
Telecommunication industry